Clarence Murphy was a professional baseball player who played left field. He spent two seasons in pro-baseball, one in Major League Baseball. In total, Murphy played 1 game at the Major League level, and had 3 plate appearances where he didn't get a hit

Professional career
Murphy began his career in 1886 with the Major League Louisville Colonels. On the defensive side, Murphy played his only game in the outfield, and in 2 total chances he made 2 putouts. In 3 at bats, Murphy didn't get a hit. The next season, Murphy played what would be his last season in professional baseball with the minor league St. Paul Saints of the Northwestern League.

References

External links

Louisville Colonels players
St. Paul Saints (Northwestern League) players
Major League Baseball left fielders
Year of death missing
Year of birth missing